The 2014 BYU Cougars women's soccer team represented BYU during the 2014 NCAA Division I women's soccer season. The Cougars were coached for a 20th consecutive season by Jennifer Rockwood, who was co-coach in 1995 and became the solo head coach in 1996. Before 1995 BYU women's soccer competed as a club team and not as a member of the NCAA. The Cougars entered the 2014 season having won back-to-back West Coast Conference championships and having made the NCAA Tournament each of the last two seasons and in 15 of the 19 seasons that Rockwood has been the head coach. The Cougars would win the WCC title and secure a berth in the College Cup, where they lost to Colorado playing in the snow.

Media

Television & Internet Streaming
For 2014 all but 2 Cougars home games aired on BYUtv. All BYUtv games were simulcast on BYU Radio. Spencer Linton and Natalyn Lewis served as the BYUtv broadcast team. The remaining two home games were streamed online through TheW.tv.
All road games had internet streaming capabilities. Two road games were televised. The game at Utah was shown on Pac-12 Networks while the game at Denver was shown on Altitude 2 (and streamed online through Pioneer Vision). The game at Cal State Fullerton aired on BigWest.tv, at Tennessee streamed on SEC Network+, at SMU streamed for a cost through PonyUp TV, and all conference road games were streamed through the school's website or on TheW.tv.

Nu Skin Cougar IMG Sports Network

For the first time ever the Cougar IMG Sports Network entered into a contract to broadcast BYU Cougars women's soccer games. Greg Wrubell provided play-by-play while former men's assistant coach Hugh Van Wagenen acted as analyst. For game where Van Wagenen wasn't available Colette Jepson Smith filled in as analyst. The games were streamed exclusively on BYUcougars.com and through the BYU Cougars athletic app.

Schedule

 *- Denotes WCC game
x- Denotes Cougar IMG Sports Network broadcast
y- Television Broadcast
z- Internet Stream

Blue/White Classic

x-Alumni Game

xz-Cal State Fullerton
Series History: BYU leads series 6–0
Broadcaster: Mike Martinez (BigWest.tv)

xy-Washington State
Series History: BYU leads series 3–2–1
Broadcasters: Spencer Linton, Natalyn Lewis, & Lauren Francom (BYUtv)

z-Tennessee
Series History: Series Even 1–1
Broadcasters: Brian Rice & Tori Beeler Watson (SEC Network+)

xy-Baylor
Series History: BYU leads series 1–0
Broadcasters: Spencer Linton, Natalyn Lewis, & Lauren Francom (BYUtv)

xy-Utah
Series History: BYU leads series 19–6–1
Broadcasters: Jason Knapp & Temryss Lane (Pac-12 Network)

z-LSU
Series History: Series even 1–1–1
Broadcasters: Robbie Bullough & Amber Wadsworth (TheW.tv)

xy-Long Beach State
Series History: BYU leads 4–2
Broadcasters: Spencer Linton & Natalyn Lewis (BYUtv)

xy-Oregon
Series History: BYU leads series 3–0–1
Broadcasters: Spencer Linton & Natalyn Lewis (BYUtv)

xz-Colorado College
Series History: Series even 1–1
Broadcasters: Robbie Bullough, Amber Wadsworth, & Colette Jepson Smith (TheW.tv)

xy-Denver
Series History: Series even 1–1
Broadcasters: Mike Evans & Kristen Hamilton (ALT 2)

xz-SMU
Series History: SMU leads series 1–0
Broadcaster: Lindsey Olsen (PonyUp TV)

*z-San Diego
Series History: BYU leads series 4–2
Broadcaster: Jack Cronin (TheW.tv)

*y-Portland
Series History: Series even 4–4
Broadcasters: Ty Brandenburg, Natalyn Lewis, & Lauren Francom (BYUtv)

*y-Gonzaga
Series History: BYU leads series 6–0
Broadcasters: Spencer Linton & Natalyn Lewis (BYUtv)

*z-Loyola Marymount
Series History: BYU leads series 4–1
Broadcasters: No audio- Video only (LMU All Access)

*xy-Santa Clara
Series History: Santa Clara leads series 6–0–2
Broadcasters: Spencer Linton & Natalyn Lewis (BYUtv)

*xy-San Francisco
Series History: BYU leads series 5–0
Broadcasters: Dave McCann & Natalyn Lewis (BYUtv)

*xz-Saint Mary's
Series History: BYU leads series 4–0
Broadcasters: Daniel Conlin & Ashley Neid (TheW.tv)

*z-Pacific
Series History: BYU leads series 4–1
Broadcasters: Alan Sanchez (TheW.tv)

*z-Pepperdine
Series History: BYU leads series 3–2
Broadcasters: Al Epstein & Jen Karson (TheW.tv)

x- College Cup: Colorado
Series History: BYU leads series 3–1–1
Broadcasters: Ann Schatz & Kyndra de St. Aubin (P12 Mtn & AZ)

Roster

References

BYU Women's Soccer
BYU
BYU Cougars women's soccer seasons